Republic of Macedonia competed at the 2016 Winter Youth Olympics in Lillehammer, Norway from 12 to 21 February 2016.

Alpine skiing

Boys

Cross-country skiing

Boys

See also
Macedonia at the 2016 Summer Olympics

References

2016 in Republic of Macedonia sport
Nations at the 2016 Winter Youth Olympics
North Macedonia at the Youth Olympics